Gedion Timotheos (Amharic: ጌድዮን ቲሞጢዎስ) is an Ethiopian politician who had served as Minister of Justice until 2 November 2021, who previously served as the Ethiopian attorney general before the position again was renamed to the Minister of Justice.

Government positions
Gedion Timotheos successively held the positions of State Attorney of Ethiopia and then the Attorney General. , he held the position of Minister of Justice.

References 

Living people
Justice ministers of Ethiopia
Attorneys general
Year of birth missing (living people)
Addis Ababa University alumni
Central European University alumni